Barrallier Island is a very small uninhabited island located  northwest of French Island in Victoria, Australia.

The island is named after Francis Barrallier, who was responsible for the charting of Western Port.

Flora & fauna 
 Sparse scrub and grass vegetation on the higher parts of the island
 Mangroves on the southern shore

References

Islands of Victoria (Australia)
Western Port
Uninhabited islands of Australia